Ernest Severn (Johannesburg, 3 May 1933Thousand Oaks, 27 November 1987) was an American child screen actor.

He was born Ernest Hubbard Smuts Severn, son of Dr. Clifford Brill Severn (1890-1981) and his South African wife Rachel Malherbe (1897-1984). His parents emigrated from South Africa to Los Angeles after he was born. He had seven siblings who were all child actors: Venetia Severn, Clifford Severn, Yvonne Severn, Raymond Severn, Christopher Severn, William Severn and Winston Severn.

Ernest Severn and his brothers Raymond and Christopher all acted in the 1943 film The Man from Down Under.

Selected filmography
 The Man from Down Under (1943) - Tough boy
 A Guy Named Joe (1943) - Davey, English boy
 The Hour Before the Dawn (1944) - Willie
 Pursued (1947) - Young Jeb

References

Bibliography 
John Holmstrom, The Moving Picture Boy: An International Encyclopaedia from 1895 to 1995, Norwich, Michael Russell, 1996, pp. 187–188.

External links
 

1933 births
1987 deaths
20th-century American male actors
American male child actors
American male film actors
People from Johannesburg